Qalatuiyeh (also Romanized as Qalātū’īyeh; also known as Ghalatoo’eyeh, Qalātū, and Qalātūyeh) is a village in Khabar Rural District, in the Central District of Baft County, Kerman Province, Iran. At the 2006 census, its population was 9, in 4 families.

References 

Populated places in Baft County